SP-381  is a state highway in São Paulo, Brazil.

References

Highways in São Paulo (state)